Ajman may refer to:

Ajman, the capital of the emirate of Ajman, one of the seven emirates constituting the United Arab Emirates 
Ajman (tribe), a bedouin tribe of northeastern Arabia
Ajman Club, football club from Ajman, United Arab Emirates
Ajman Castle, Škofja Loka, Slovenia
Ajman, or more commonly ajwain, a spice from south Asia